ABWH may refer to:

Anderson Bruford Wakeman Howe, a progressive rock group
Association of Black Women Historians